The discography of Anthony J. Resta, composer, record producer and multi-instrumentalist, consists of over one hundred thirty albums and EPs, over twenty singles, and also includes work on film and television soundtracks. In addition to his work as a producer for other artists through his studio Bopnique Musique, Resta has released work as a principal performer, as a member of TV Mania with Nick Rhodes and Warren Cuccurullo, and is a  former member of the composers' collective, ELECTRONS, with Eric Alexandrakis, Warren Cuccurullo, Steve Ferrone, and Roger O'Donnell.

As a producer and musician (with credits for drums, guitar, bass, keyboards, flute, and other instruments) Resta has contributed to albums by Duran Duran, Shawn Mullins, Guster, Collective Soul, the Josh Joplin Band, Perry Farrell, Megadeth, Needtobreathe, Full Devil Jacket, Green River Ordinance, and Extreme. The single "Heavy" from Collective Soul's Dosage reached #1 on the 1999 Mainstream Rock chart, and "Shimmer" from Shawn Mullins' Soul's Core was used in the soundtrack for Dawson's Creek and the promotional campaign for the 2000 Summer Olympics.

Albums and soundtracks that have earned certified RIAA Gold and Platinum awards with Resta's involvement include Duran Duran's Greatest (gold and platinum), and Thank You (gold), Shawn Mullins' Soul's Core (gold and platinum), Collective Soul's Dosage (gold and platinum), and Blender (gold), the Scream 3 soundtrack (gold), and the Twilight soundtrack (gold, platinum, and double platinum).

Additional notable clients of Resta include Elton John, Missing Persons, Dale Bozzio, Blondie, NEEDTOBREATHE, Del Marquis of Scissor Sisters, Peter Wolf, Donna De Lory, Nuno Bettencourt, Lúcia Moniz, Perry Farrell, and Sarah Evans. Resta has also produced or worked with bands and artists including Nuno Bettencourt's Population 1, Mourning Widows, John Cate & The van Gogh Brothers, Andrea Surova, Coby Grant, the Mudhens, The Elevator Drops, Shelter, Letters To Cleo, Suze DeMarchi, Splashdown, the New Collisions, Casey Desmond, Prospect Hill, Minky Starshine, Jared Dylan, and David Thorne Scott.

For film and television, Resta has done production and programming work on soundtracks for the films The Saint, Scream 3, and Twilight, and television series Wasteland and Melrose Place, among others.

As a member of TV Mania, Resta has worked with Nick Rhodes and Warren Cuccurullo on Bored with Prozac and the Internet?, on Duran Duran releases Medazzaland and "Electric Barbarella", with Blondie "Studio 54" and "Pop Trash Movie", and for Missing Persons, a remix of "Destination Unknown".

With the composers' collective ELECTRONS, Resta contributed underground electronica compositions and soundtrack work.

Albums

Studio albums

As principal performer

As producer, composer, writer, programmer, sound engineer, performer on other artists' albums

With TV Mania

With ELECTRONS

Tribute and cover albums

As producer, composer, writer, programmer, sound engineer, performer on other artists' albums

Live albums

As producer, composer, writer, programmer, sound engineer, performer on other artists' albums

Compilation albums

With TV Mania

With ELECTRONS

EPs

As producer, composer, writer, programmer, sound engineer, performer on other artists' EPs

Singles

As principal performer

As producer, composer, writer, programmer, sound engineer, performer on other artists' singles

With TV Mania

Filmography

Soundtracks

Film

With TV Mania

With ELECTRONS

Video albums

Television

With ELECTRONS

References

External links
 bopnique musique official website
 Anthony J. Resta's official website
 ELECTRONS official website

Resta, Anthony